An ejection fraction (EF) is the volumetric fraction (or portion of the total) of fluid (usually blood) ejected from a chamber (usually the heart) with each contraction (or heartbeat). It can refer to the cardiac atrium, ventricle, gall bladder, or leg veins, although if unspecified it usually refers to the left ventricle of the heart. EF is widely used as a measure of the pumping efficiency of the heart and is used to classify heart failure types. It is also used as an indicator of the severity of heart failure, although it has recognized limitations.

The EF of the left heart, known as the left ventricular ejection fraction (LVEF), is calculated by dividing the volume of blood pumped from the left ventricle per beat (stroke volume) by the volume of blood collected in the left ventricle at the end of diastolic filling (end-diastolic volume). LVEF is an indicator of the effectiveness of pumping into the systemic circulation. The EF of the right heart, or right ventricular ejection fraction (RVEF), is a measure of the efficiency of pumping into the pulmonary circulation. A heart which cannot pump sufficient blood to meet the body's requirements (i.e., heart failure) will often, but not invariably, have a reduced ventricular ejection fraction.

Measurement
Modalities applied to measurement of ejection fraction is an emerging field of medical mathematics and subsequent computational applications. Perhaps the first common bedrock measurement method was echocardiography, although cardiac magnetic resonance imaging (MRI), cardiac computed tomography, ventriculography and nuclear medicine (gated SPECT and radionuclide angiography) scans may also be used. Measurements by different modalities are not easily interchangeable. Historically, the gold standard for measurement of the ejection fraction was ventriculography, but cardiac MRI is now considered the best method. Prior to these more advanced techniques, the combination of electrocardiography and phonocardiography was used to accurately estimate ejection fraction.

Physiology

Normal values
Healthy individuals typically have ejection fractions between 50% and 65%, although the lower limits of normality are difficult to establish with confidence.

Pathophysiology

Heart failure categories 
Damage to heart muscle (myocardium), such as occurring following myocardial infarction or cardiomyopathy, compromises the heart's performance as an efficient pump and may reduce ejection fraction. Such reduction in the EF can manifest itself as heart failure. The 2021 European Society of Cardiology guidelines for the diagnosis and treatment of acute and chronic heart failure subdivided heart failure into three categories on the basis of LVEF:
 normal or preserved LVEF [≥50%] (HFpEF)
 moderately reduced LVEF [in the range of 41–49%] (HFmrEF)
 reduced LVEF [≤40%] (HFrEF)]
A chronically low ejection fraction less than 30% is an important threshold in qualification for disability benefits in the US.

Calculation
By definition, the volume of blood within a ventricle at the end of diastole is the end-diastolic volume (EDV). Likewise, the volume of blood left in a ventricle at the end of systole (contraction) is the end-systolic volume (ESV). The difference between EDV and ESV is the stroke volume (SV). The ejection fraction is the fraction of the end-diastolic volume that is ejected with each beat; that is, it is stroke volume (SV) divided by end-diastolic volume (EDV):

Where the stroke volume is given by:

EF is inherently a relative measurement—as is any fraction, ratio, or percentage, whereas the stroke volume, end-diastolic volume or end-systolic volume are absolute measurements.

History
After William Harvey's description of the basic mechanism of the circulation in 1628, it was initially assumed that the heart emptied completely during systole. However, in 1856 Chauveau and Faivre observed that some fluid remained in the heart after contraction. This was confirmed by Roy and Adami in 1888. In 1906, Henderson estimated the ratio of the volume discharged in systole to the total volume of the left ventricle to be approximately 2/3. In 1933, Gustav Nylin proposed that the ratio of the heart volume/stroke volume (the reciprocal of ejection fraction) could be used as a measure of cardiac function. in 1952 Bing and colleagues used a minor modification of Nylin's suggestion (EDV/SV) to assess right ventricular function using a dye dilution technique. Exactly when the relationship between end diastolic volume and stroke volume was inverted into its current form is unclear. Holt calculated the ratio SV/EDV and noted that '...The ventricle empties itself in a "fractional" manner, approximately 46 per cent of its end-diastolic volume being ejected with each stroke and 54 per cent remaining in the ventricle at the end of systole'. In 1962, Folse and Braunwald used the ratio of forward stroke volume/EDV and observed that "estimations of the fraction of the left ventricular end-diastolic volume that is ejected into the aorta during each cardiac cycle, as well as of the ventricular end-diastolic and residual volumes, provide information that is fundamental to a hemodynamic analysis of left ventricular function". Elliott, Lane and Gorlin used the term "ejection fraction" in a conference paper abstract published in January 1964. In 1965 Bartle et al. used the term ejected fraction for the ratio SV/EDV, and the term ejection fraction was used in two review articles in 1968 suggesting a wide currency by that time.

References 

Cardiovascular physiology